Charilaos (Greek: Χαρίλαος, in latin letters also spelled Kharilaos and Harilaos, stress on the second syllable) is a Greek language male given name.

Bearers of the name include:
 Charilaos Trikoupis (1832-1896)
 Charilaos Vasilakos (1875-1964)
 Charilaos Giannakas (19th-20th centuries)
 Charilaos Tsantis (1909-1979)
 Charilaos Mitrelias (-1988)
 Charilaos Florakis (1914-2005)
 Charilaos Stavrakis (1956-)
 Charilaos Pappas (1983-)
 Charilaos Bikas (1992-)

See also 
 Charis (name)

Greek masculine given names